Trigonopterus palawanensis is a species of flightless weevil in the genus Trigonopterus from the Philippines.

Etymology
The specific name is derived from that of the type locality.

Description
Individuals measure 2.13–2.21 mm in length.  Body is slightly oval in shape.  General coloration is a dark rust-color or black, with rust-colored tarsi and antennae.

Range

Phylogeny
T. palawanensis is part of the T. wallacei species group.

References

palawanensis
Beetles described in 2014
Beetles of Asia
Insects of the Philippines
Fauna of Palawan